Susan Island is an island in the North Coast of British Columbia, Canada. To its west is Finlayson Channel; to its east Mathieson Channel. Roderick Island lies to its north and Dowager Island to its south. James Johnstone, one of George Vancouver's lieutenants during his 1791-95 expedition, first charted its west and east coasts in 1793.

References

Islands of British Columbia
North Coast of British Columbia
Range 3 Coast Land District